Naphtha ( or ) is a flammable liquid hydrocarbon mixture.

Mixtures labelled naphtha have been produced from natural gas condensates, petroleum distillates, and the distillation of coal tar and peat.  In different industries and regions naphtha may also be crude oil or refined products such as kerosene. 

Nephi and naphthar are sometimes used as synonyms. It is also known as Shellite in Australia.

Etymology

The word naphtha is from Latin and Ancient Greek (νάφθα), derived from Middle Persian naft ("wet", "naphtha"), the latter meaning of which was an assimilation from the Akkadian napṭu (see Semitic relatives such as Arabic  nafṭ ["petroleum"], Syriac ܢܰܦܬܳܐ naftā, and Hebrew נֵפְט neft, meaning petroleum).

In Ancient Greek, it was used to refer to any sort of petroleum or pitch.

There is a hypothesis that the word is connected with the name of the Indo-Iranian god Apam Napat, which occurs in Vedic and in Avestic; the name means "grandson of (the) waters", and the Vedas describe him as emerging from water golden and shining "with bright rays", perhaps inspired by a burning seepage of natural gas.

Antiquity 
The Greek word  designates one of the materials used to stoke the fiery furnace in the Song of the Three Children (possibly 1st or 2nd cent. BC).  The translation of Charles Brenton renders this as "rosin". The book of II Maccabees (2nd cent. BC) tells how a "thick water" was put on a sacrifice at the time of Nehemiah and when the sun shone it caught fire. It adds that "those around Nehemiah termed this 'Nephthar', which means Purification, but it is called Nephthaei by the many."

The naptha of antiquity is explained to be a "highly flammable light fraction of petroleum, an extremely volatile, strong-smelling, gaseous liquid, common in oil deposits of the Near East"; it was a chief ingredient in incendiary devices described by Latin authors of the Roman period.

Modern period 
Solvent naphtha has denoted a product (xylene or trimethylbenzenes) derived by fractional distillation from petroleum; these mineral spirits, also known as "Stoddard Solvent", was originally the main active ingredient in Fels Naptha laundry soap. 

The usage of the term "naphtha" during this time typically implies petroleum naphtha, a colorless liquid with a similar odor to gasoline. However, "coal tar naphtha", a reddish brown liquid that is a mixture of hydrocarbons (toluene, xylene, and cumene, etc.), could also be intended in some contexts.

Petroleum 
In older usage, "naphtha" simply meant crude oil, but this usage is now obsolete in English. There are a number of cognates to the word in different modern languages, typically signifying "petroleum" or "crude oil".  

The Ukrainian and Belarusian word нафта (nafta), Lithuanian, Latvian and Estonian "nafta" and the Persian naft mean "crude oil". The Russian word нефть (neft') means "crude oil", but нафта (nafta) is a synonym of ligroin. Also, in Albania, Bosnia and Herzegovina, Bulgaria, Croatia, Finland, Italy, Serbia, Slovenia, Macedonia nafta (нафта in Cyrillic) is colloquially used to indicate diesel fuel and crude oil. In the Czech Republic and Slovakia, nafta was historically used for both diesel fuel and crude oil, but its use for crude oil is now obsolete and it generally indicates diesel fuel. In Bulgarian, nafta means diesel fuel, while neft, as well as petrol (петрол in Cyrillic), means crude oil. Nafta is also used in everyday parlance in Argentina, Paraguay and Uruguay to refer to gasoline/petrol. In Flemish, the word naft(e) is used colloquially for gasoline.

Types
Various qualifiers have been added to the term "naphtha" by different sources in an effort to make it more specific:

One source distinguishes by boiling point:

Another source which differentiates light and heavy comments on the hydrocarbon structure, but offers a less precise dividing line:

Both of these are useful definitions, but they are incompatible with one another and the latter does not provide for mixes containing both six and seven carbon atoms per molecule. These terms are also sufficiently broad that they are not widely useful.

Uses

Heavy crude oil dilution 
Naphtha is used to dilute heavy crude oil to reduce its viscosity and enable/facilitate transport; undiluted heavy crude cannot normally be transported by pipeline, and may also be difficult to pump onto oil tankers. Other common dilutants include natural-gas condensate and light crude. However, naphtha is a particularly efficient dilutant and can be recycled from diluted heavy crude after transport and processing. The importance of oil dilutants has increased as global production of lighter crude oils has fallen and shifted to exploitation of heavier reserves.

Fuel 
Light naphtha is used as a fuel in some commercial applications. One notable example is wick-based cigarette lighters, such as the Zippo, which draw “lighter fluid”—naphtha—into a wick from a reservoir to be ignited using the flint and wheel.

It is also a fuel for camping stoves and oil lanterns, known as “white gas”, where naphtha’s low boiling point makes it easy to ignite. Naphtha is sometimes preferred over kerosene as it clogs fuel lines less. The outdoor equipment manufacturer MSR published a list of tradenames and translations to help outdoor enthusiasts obtain the correct products in various countries.

Naptha was also historically used as a fuel in some small launch boats where steam technology was impractical; most were built to circumvent safety laws relating to traditional steam launches.

Plastics 
Naphtha is a crucial component in the production of plastics.

Health and safety considerations
The safety data sheets (SDSs) from various naphtha vendors indicate various hazards such as flammable mixture of hydrocarbons: flammability, carcinogenicity, skin and airway irritation, etc.

Humans can be exposed to naphtha in the workplace by inhalation, ingestion, dermal contact, and eye contact. The US Occupational Safety and Health Administration (OSHA) has set the permissible exposure limit for naphtha in the workplace as 100 ppm (400 mg/m3) over an 8-hour workday. The US National Institute for Occupational Safety and Health (NIOSH) has set a recommended exposure limit (REL) of 100 ppm (400 mg/m3) over an 8-hour workday. At levels of 1000 ppm, which equates to 10 times the lower exposure limit, naphtha is immediately dangerous to life and health.

See also
 Coleman fuel
 Fluid catalytic cracking
 Greek fire
 Hydrocarbon
 Kerosene
 Mineral spirits
 Naphtha launch
 Oil refinery
 Petroleum distillation
 Petroleum naphtha
 Tar

References

Petroleum products
Hydrocarbon solvents
Commodity chemicals